The 75th Regiment of Foot (Prince of Wales's Regiment) was an infantry regiment of the British Army from 1778 to 1783.

The regiment was raised in Wales in January 1778 and named after the future King George IV. Apart from some officers seconded to North America, the regiment remained based in Wales until it was disbanded in 1783.

Regimental Colonels
1778–1779: Gen. William Picton
1779–1782: Gen. George Morrison
1782–1783: Maj-Gen. Thomas Pelham-Clinton, 3rd Duke of Newcastle (Earl of Lincoln)

References

Infantry regiments of the British Army
Military units and formations established in 1778
Military units and formations disestablished in 1783
1778 establishments in England